The International Social Revolutionary Congress was an anarchist meeting in London between July 14–20, 1881, with the aim of founding a new International organization for anti-authoritiarian socialism (i.e., anarchists).

Preparations 

Planning for the London congress began following a small Brussels conference in 1880. The intent of the London meeting would be to explore founding an International organization dedicated to anti-authoritarian and decentralist socialism. The congress had 45 delegates, including anarchist luminaries Peter Kropotkin, Errico Malatesta, and Louise Michel. Planned in secret, delegates were known by code number.

John Most, who contributed to the impetus for the meeting, ultimately did not attend from jail, having written in celebration of the assassination of Alexander II of Russia some weeks before the congress. The new Social Revolutionary outgrowths of the American Socialistic Labor Party did not send delegates but were represented in spirit by other delegates. Despite security measures, an attendee named Serreaux was later determined to have been an agent provocateur from the French police.

Proceedings and results 

The congress was ultimately unproductive, marred by bombastic speech and obsessive sensationalism related to Alexander II's assassination. Though the delegates moved to form a new International organization based on autonomous federations, resuscitating the International Working Men's Association, the resulting Black International did not grow beyond a loose association of groups. The International had no central power, which would have conflicted with its federalist orientation, apart from a bureau of information, which itself did not last long. While governments would blame assassinations and terrorism on the Black International, the group truthfully held little organized power. A follow-up congress, planned for 1882, was abandoned.

References

Bibliography 

 
 
 
 
 

1881 conferences
1881 in politics
1881 in London
Anarchism in the United Kingdom
History of anarchism
Political congresses
July 1881 events